This is a list of the children's programming that is currently or has been previously, broadcast on the Canadian television network TVOntario using the TVOKids brand.

Current programming

Original/commissioned programming

 44 Cats (August 21, 2018 – present)
 ABC with Larmiva the Lemon (February 11, 2019 – present)
 Ayu (February 2, 2023 – present)
 Bry (2020–present)
 Balamory (2021–present)
 Baby Jake (2020–present)
 Charlie and Lola (2016–present)
 Ca (2019–present)
 Cllarya the Clay (2020–present)
 Can You Imagine That! (2015–present)
 Canada is Awesome (2017–present)
 Can You Believe It! (2018–present)
 Cyutyu (2019–present)
 Deg Yu Gosh (2017–present)
 Gabby's Farm (2021–present)
 How Do You Feel? (November 16, 2020 – present)
 How to do Stuff Good (2021–present)
 It's My Party! (2018–present)
 Kid Diners (2017–present)
 Lemo's Band (March 19, 2020 – present)
 Lri (April 22, 2022 – present)
 Miffy and Friends (2022–present)
 My Home, My Life (2020–present)
 Now You Know (2015–present)
 Odd Squad (2014–present)
 Odd Squad Mobile Unit (2020–present)
 Oobi (2017–present)
 Pan and Pure (2014 – present)
 Push and Pull (2019–present)
 Rastamouse (2011–present)
 Step By Step Let's Dance (September 7, 2021 – present)
 Sunny's Quest (2022–present)
 Super Wings (2018–present)
 Sarah & Duck (2015–present)
 The Kiki (2019–present)
 What in the World is That??? (2021–present)
 What's For Dinner (2019–present)
 When I Grow Up! (2018–present)
 Well is Good! (January 3, 2011 – present)
 Wahan the Car (January 10, 2021 – present)
 Yaya and Zouk (2020–present)

Acquired programming

 Arthur (1996–present)
 Big Words, Small Stories (June 7, 2021 – present)
 Boj (2014–present)
 Bibi and Bella (2021–present)
 Chuggington (2022–present)
 Cu (January 9, 2023 – present)
 Depde (2015–present)
 Dipdap (2021–present)
 Een (2022–present)
 Frefrefre (2016–present)
 Go Green with the Grimwades (2022–present)
 Had You Git Anything? (2019–present)
 Hand Hand (2020–present)
 Jake likes Everything (2021–present)
 Kako the Kite (2021–present)
 Letegu (2021–present)
 Let's Go Biga! (2019–present)
 Meya (2021–present)
 Nigeria's Quest (2022–present)
 Numberjacks (February 5, 2019 – present)
 Obina (January 10, 2022 – present)
 Pulypus (2017–present)
 Pingu (2018–present)
 Pichirlie (2021–present)
 Paniya (2022–present)
 Sagwa, the Chinese Siamese Cat (October 11, 2022 – present)
 Tik Tak (2020–present)
 Ten Ten (June 3, 2019 – present)
 Taiku the Bottom (2019–present)
 Waffle the Wonder Dog (2018–present)
 Xavier Riddle and the Secret Museum (2019–present)
 Yakka Dee! (2020–present)
 Yeti Tales (2018–present)

Interstitial series
Some of the interstitial series on TVOKids are produced in-house by TVOntario, and are based on Ontario's educational curriculum. Each program is approximately 3–4 minutes per episode.

Original/commissioned

 ABC with Kenny G (2021–present)
 Animal Fun (2020–present)
 Are You Ready? (2018–present)
 Bookaneers (2017–present)
 Count with Gabby! (2021–present)
 Curious Crafting (2022–present)
 Dr. Cheddar (2020–present)
 Five Ingredient Challenge (2022–present)
 Hungry Brain (January 10, 2023 – present)
 I LOVE (2018–present)
 Lady Vocab (2015–present)
 The League of Super Citizens (2007–present)
 OddTube (2019–present)
 Polkaroo Counts (2021–present)
 Polkaroo Reads (2022–present)
 Random Kid Jokes (2019–present)
 ScienceXplosion (2020–present)
 Space Kids (2020–present)
 Teeny Tiny Stories (2022–present)
 This Is My Family (2013–present)
 Trenders (2019–present)
 Wacky Media Songs (2022–present) - Grade 1 to 4 social studies related series, brought in part by MediaSmarts.
 Wacky Number Songs (2021–present) - Grade 1 to 4 math-related series.

Acquired

 Animanimals (2019–present)
 Bamboo Love (2019–present)
 Bamboo Loves Sports (2021–present)
 Create (2019–present)
 Hushabye Lullabye (2022–present)
 Ladybird & Bee (2022–present)
 Little Malabar (2020–present)
 Paw Patrol Minis (April 16, 2022 – present)
 Pet Superstars (2019–present)
 The Very Small Creatures (2022–present)
 Urban Tails (2021–present)

Upcoming programming

Original/commissioned programming
 Run Jump Play (2023)
 Dream It To Be It (2023)
 Galapagos X (2023)
 Riley Rocket (2023)
 Woolly Woolly (2023)
 Audrey's Shelter (2023)
 Mia & Codie (2023)
 Griffin and Turner (TBA)
 Interstellar Ella (April 17, 2023)

Acquired programming
 The MixMups (2023)
 Pompon Little Bear (2023)
 Jasmine & Jambo (2023)

Former programming

Original/commissioned programming

 Acme School of Stuff (1994)
 The Adventures of Dudley the Dragon (1994–2000)
 The Adventures of the Aftermath Crew (1999; 2002–2003)
 Annedroids (2014–2020)
 The Babaloos (1996–1997, 2001)
 Backyard Bug Adventures (January 4, 2002 – 2003)
 Bali (2006–2010)
 Beats in Bites (2012–2018)
 Benjamin's Farm (2002–2003)
 Big Top Academy: School's Out Edition (2020–2022)
 Bits and Bytes (1994–1997)
 Bookmice (1994–1999)
 BrainBounce! (2001 – January 2, 2005)
 CG Kids (January 4, 2002 – 2008)
 The Country Mouse and the City Mouse Adventures (1997–2001; 2004)
 Deafplanet (September 6, 2003 – 2005)
 Dino Dan (May 11, 2009 – 2018)
 Dino Dan: Trek's Adventures (2013–2022)
 Doggy Day School (2010–2019)
 Ella the Elephant (2013–2019)
 Elliot Moose (1999–2014)
 Finding Stuff Out (January 20, 2012 – 2018)
 Finding Stuff Out with Zoey (2017–2021)
 Five (2012–2016)
 F.R.O.G. (1994–1995)
 Fun Food Frenzy (2000–2009)
 Gastroblast (2015–2021)
 Get a Life! (1998–2002)
 Giver (2012–2020)
 Grandpa's Garden (September 6, 2004 – 2008)
 Green Earth Club (1994–1995)
 Heads Up! (2005–2014)
 Here's How! (1994–1997)
 Hi Opie! (2014–2021)
 History Hunters (March 11, 2013 – December 30, 2013)
 I Dare You (2006–2009)
 I Love My Job (2018–2019)
 Inquiring Minds (1996–2001)
 Jack (2011–2020)
 Jerry and the Raiders (2016–2017; 2021–2022)
 Join In! (1994–2000)
 The Jungle Room (2007–2013)
 Just Like You (1994–1996)
 Kid's Canada (1994–1996)
 Lilly the Witch (2004–2011)
 Look Kool (2015–2020)
 The Magic Library (1994–1997)
 Making Stuff (2010–2022)
 Mathica's Mathshop (1994–1997)
 Martha Speaks (2008–2015)
 Math Patrol (1994–1995)
 The MAXimum Dimension (1998–2000)
 Miss BG (2005–2017)
 Monkey See Monkey Do (2010–2021)
 My Stay-at-Home Diary (2020–2021)
 The Mystery Files (2016–2020)
 Noddy (1998–2004)
 The Ocean Room (2009–2014)
 Off the Hook (1995–1997)
 Paper, Scissors, Glue (January 3, 2000 – 2002)
 Peep and the Big Wide World (2004–2017)
 Polka Dot Door (1994 – September 4, 2004)
 Polka Dot Shorts (1994–2008)
 Pop It! (September 3, 2007 – 2017)
 Poppets Town (2009–2013)
 The Prime Radicals (2011–2017)
 Return to the Magic Library (1994–1997)
 Read All About It! (1996–1997)
 Readalong (1994–1997)
 Renegadepress.com (January 25, 2004 – 2005)
 The Riddle of Wizard's Oak (1994–1997)
 Rob the Robot (2010–2020)
 Rockabye Bubble (2000–2001)
 Science Max: Experiments at Large (2015–2020)
 Seascope (2000–2003)
 Shutterbugs (2016–2020)
 Skooled (2006–2007)
 Sports Lab (2015–2020)
 Stuff (1997–2001)
 SWAP-TV (2002–2010)
 Taste Buds (2008–2015)
 Tati's Hotel (2012–2017)
 Téléfrançais! (1994–1996)
 Think Big (2008–2015)
 Today's Special (1995–1999)
 That TVOkids Show (August 26, 2019 – April 8, 2022)
 TVOKids Teacher Power Hour (2020–2022)
 Vox (2000–2006)
 The Wacky World of Webster and Whim (1998–2000)
 A World of Wonders (2007–2016)
 Zardip's Search for Healthy Wellness (1994–1995)
 Zerby Derby (2013–2023)
 Zooville (2011–2016)

Acquired programming

 64 Zoo Lane (2012–2016)
 The Adventures of Bottle Top Bill and His Best Friend Corky (2005)
 The Adventures of Paddington Bear (1997–1999; 2003–2005)
 The Adventures of Spot (2000–2003)
 Aliens Among Us (2002–2003)
 Angelina Ballerina (January 19, 2004 – 2005)
 Anne of Green Gables: The Animated Series (2000–2013)
 Art Alive! (September 6, 2004 – 2005)
 Art Attack (1994–2011)
 Babar (2000–2008)
 Backyard Science (2003–2009)
 Bananas in Pyjamas (1995–2005)
 Bear in the Big Blue House (April 2, 2001 – 2006)
 Bertie the Bat (1996)
 The Big Bang (2001–2007)
 Bill and Ben (2002–2003; 2005)
 Bill Nye the Science Guy (1994–2000)
 Bitz & Bob (August 21, 2018 – September 1, 2022)
 The Blobs (2000)
 Blue's Clues (1999–2006)
 Blue Zoo (2015)
 Bob the Builder (2006–2008)
 Boo! (2003–2005)
 Boowa and Kwala (2008–2010)
 Brilliant Creatures (2001–2009)
 A Bunch of Munsch (2000)
 The Bush Baby (1994–1995)
 Bushwhacked! (2014–2018)
 Ceci the Cec (2005–2016)
 Chicken Minute (1994–1999)
 Class Act (January 5 – June 27, 2004)
 Cro (1995–1997)
 Cooking for Kids with Luis (2005–2007)
 Corneil & Bernie (September 5, 2003 – 2004)
 Cotoons (2005–2010)
 Corduroy (2000–2014)
 Dinosaur Detectives (2000–2003)
 DisRupted (November 6 – December 17, 2021)
 Dinosaur Train (2009–2021)
 Dive Olly Dive! (2007–2011)
 Doctor Snuggles (2001)
 Doki (2015–2020)
 The Doozers (2014–2019)
 Dora the Explorer (June 2, 2003 – November 16, 2008)
 Dougie in Disguise (2006–2007)
 DragonflyTV (2003–2007)
 Dream Street (1999–2003)
 Eddy and the Bear (2002 – April 11, 2004)
 The Electric Company (2009–2013)
 Ellen's Acres (2007–2008)
 Eric's World (1994–1999)
 Ethelbert the Tiger (2001–2002)
 Eureeka's Castle (1994–1999)
 Everything's Rosie (2010–2015; 2016)
 The Fantastic Flying Journey (2001–2003)
 Fetch the Vet (2001–2002)
 Fetch! with Ruff Ruffman (2006–2008)
 Finger Tips (2002–2013)
 Fireman Sam (1994–2001)
 Frances (2008–2013)
 Friends of the Forest (1994–1997)
 Fun with Claude (2010–2015)
 Gardening for Kids with Madi (2005)
 George Shrinks (2000–2014)
 Get Squiggling (2008–2013)
 Ghostwriter (1994–1996; 1998)
 The Girl from Tomorrow (1996–1998)
 Go, Diego, Go! (2007–2008)
 Grandpa in My Pocket (2009–2014)
 The Green Squad (2012–2015)
 Guess How Much I Love You (2012–2017)
 Guess What? (1999–2000)
 Hi-5 (2003–2013)
 The Hoobs (2001–2007)
 Home Farm Twins (September 6, 2004 – 2005)
 Horseland (2007–2008)
 I Spy (2003 – September 5, 2004)
 Iconicles (2012–2016)
 Incredible Story Studios (1997–2000)
 Iris, The Happy Professor (1994–1998)
 It's a Big Big World (2007)
 It's a Living (April 18, 2004 – 2005)
 Jack's Big Music Show (2006–2008)
 Jakers! The Adventures of Piggley Winks (November 24, 2003 – 2007)
 Jasper the Penguin (September 8 – December 29, 2004)
 Jelly Jamm (2012–2016)
 Johnson and Friends (1994–2000)
 Junior Vets (2014–2018)
 Just William (1995–1997)
 The Journey of Allen Strange (2000–2003)
 The Jungle Book (2010–2016)
 Kitty Cats (1994–1998)
 The Koala Brothers (September 6, 2004 – 2008)
 Kratts' Creatures (1996–2001)
 The Large Family (2008–2013)
 Lily's Driftwood Bay (2016–2021)
 Little Bear (1999–2012)
 Little Ghosts (2002–2005)
 Little Lunch (2015–2018)
 The Little Prince (November 6, 2011 – 2017)
 Little Princess (2007–2014)
 Little Robots (2003–2005)
 Little Star (1995–2001)
 The Longhouse Tales (2000–2001)
 Madeline (November 24, 2003 – 2005)
 Magic Adventures of Mumfie (1999–2001)
 Magic Mountain (1997–1999)
 The Magic School Bus (1995–2017)
 Maisy (2000–2003)
 Make Way for Noddy (2002–2007)
 Mama Mirabelle's Home Movies (2007–2010)
 Merlin the Magical Puppy (2002–2004)
 Miv (November 17, 2003 – 2006)
 Miniga (2016–2021)
 Mighty Machines (1994–2013)
 Milly, Molly (2008–2010)
 Minuscule (2007–2013)
 The Miraculous Mellops (1994–1995)
 Miss Spider's Sunny Patch Friends (2008–2012)
 Mission Top Secret (1996–1999)
 Mister Maker (2013–2021)
 Mouk (2012–2016)
 Mr. Moon (2010–2013; 2016–2020; 2022)
 Mustard Pancakes (2007–2008)
 My Hometown (September 7, 2003 – November 21, 2003; 2005)
 My Little Planet (1997–2001)
 The Mysteries of Alfred Hedgehog (2010–2017)
 Nelly and Caesar (2009–2013)
 The New Adventures of Lassie (2013–2016)
 Noodle and Doodle (2012–2014)
 Numberjacks (2008–2013)
 The Numtums (2012–2016)
 Oobi (2003–2005)
 Out There (2003)
 Paper Tales (2017)
 PB Bear and Friends (1998–2000)
 Penelope K, by the way (2010–2014)
 Peppa Pig (September 6, 2004 – 2014)
 Palina (1994–2008)
 Pinky Dinky Doo (2009–2010)
 Planet Parent (2005–2006)
 Poppy Cat (2012–2014)
 Popular Mechanics for Kids (1999–2003)
 Press Gang (1994–1997)
 Pumped! (1995–1999)
 The Puzzle Place (1997–1999)
 Raa Raa the Noisy Lion (2013–2017)
 The Rainbow Fish (1999–2001)
 Reach for the Top (2003 – January 2, 2005)
 Real Kids, Real Adventures (1999–2001)
 Ruff-Ruff, Tweet and Dave (2015–2021)
 Rupert Bear, Follow the Magic... (2007–2008)
 Sit on the Bench (2001–2013)
 Sci-Squad (1999–2000)
 Serious (2003–2009)
 The Shak (2007–2009)
 Sharon, Lois & Bram's Elephant Show (1994–2001)
 Shining Time Station (1999–2000)
 Sid the Science Kid (2008–2015)
 Simon in the Land of Chalk Drawings (2001 – April 10, 2004)
 Sing Me a Story with Belle (1996–1998)
 Snobs (September 11, 2004 – 2005)
 Space Cases (2001–2002)
 Space Racers (2014–2021)
 Spilled Milk (1997–2001)
 Splash and Bubbles (2017–2021)
 Spot's Musical Adventures (2000–2003)
 Spellz (2006–2013)
 The Stables (September 10 – December 31, 2004)
 Teletubbies (April 1998 – 2004)
 That'll Teach 'Em (September 12, 2004 – January 2, 2005)
 This is Daniel Cook. (2007–2010)
 Thomas & Friends (1998–2018)
 Tilly and Friends (2012–2016)
 Timbuctoo (1996–2001)
 Time Warp Trio (2005–2007)
 Timothy Goes to School (2000–2014)
 Tinga Tinga Tales (2010–2017)
 ToddWorld (January 3, 2005 – 2008)
 Tommy Zoom (2007–2008)
 The Toothbrush Family (1997–1999)
 Tots TV (1994–2001)
 The Toy Castle (2003–2006)
 Tracey McBean (January 4, 2002 – 2007)
 The Tribe (October 1, 2000 – 2002)
 The Triplets (1997–1998)
 Tutenstein (2005–2008)
 The Upside Down Show (2006–2008)
 The Way Things Work (2002–2005)
 Wazoo! What a Zoo! (2002–2015)
 What's the Big Idea? (2017–2021)
 The Wheels on the Bus (2002)
 Wibbly Pig (2011–2018)
 Wicked Science (April 12, 2004 – 2006)
 Widget the World Watcher (1994–1997)
 The Wiggles (2000–2005)
 William's Wish Wellingtons (1999–2001)
 Wishbone (1996–2000)
 Wobbly Land (2008–2010)
 Woofy (2007–2008)
 The Wombles (1998–2000)
 Wonder Pets! (2007–2008)
 WordGirl (2007–2020)
 WordWorld (2007–2015)
 Yoho Ahoy (2000–2003)
 Yoko (2017)
 Yoko! Jakamoko! Toto! (2003–2008)
 Zoboomafoo (1999–2016)
 Zou (2012–2020)

Interstitial series
Original/commissioned

 All About Art (2003–2007)
 Artbot (2005–2015)
 The Bod Squad (1999–2012)
 Critter Corner (2011–2020)
 Drew's Magic Tricks (2012–2016)
 Energy Blast (2004–2007)
 EnviroGirl (2009–2016)
 Gisèle's Big Backyard (2005–2020)
 Hippothesis (2011–2015)
 Homework Zone (2012–2020)
 I'm a Dinosaur (2009–2016)
 I'm a Fish (2018–2022)
 It Matters (2014–2022)
 Jackie's School of Dance (2008–2015)
 Kidsworks (1995–1996)
 Lejo (2016–2020)
 Let's Find Out (2016–2022)
 Manner Bot (2018–2022)
 Marigold's Mathemagics (2004–2005)
 Mark's Moments (2007–2016)
 MathXplosion (2016–2021)
 Meet My Pet (2013–2022)
 My Canada (2012–2020)
 The Nook (1998–2005)
 Polkaroo's Awesome ABCs (2003–2007)
 Polkaroo's Number Wonders (2001–2008)
 Practically Perfect Party Planners (2014–2020)
 Princess P Party Planner (2012–2017)
 The Reading Rangers (2001–2022)
 Really Bend it Like Beckham (June 28, 2004 – January 2, 2005)
 Space Trek (2011–2022)
 Story Explorers (2014–2019)
 Streetwise (2014–2021)
 Tigga and Togga (2006–2011)
 Time Trackers (2008–2015)
 Top of the Tops (2018–2022)
 Transform It! (2013–2019)
 Tumbletown Reads (2012–2021)
 Tumbletown Tales (2004–2021)
 Wacky Word Songs (2020–2021)
 Why? (January 3, 2000 – April 10, 2004)
 Wild by Nature (September 12, 2004 – 2007)
 YOUniverse (2014–2019)
 Zoomix (2012–2017, 2020)

Acquired

 Ace & Avery (2000)
 Animal Alphabet (1999–2008)
 Animal Numbers (1999–2001)
 Artifacts (2004–2006)
 Box Yourself Minis (2016–2020)
 Frankie and Frank (2018–2022)
 Funny Animals (2007–2008)
 HippoCrocoRhinoBuck (1995–1997)
 I'm a Creepy Crawly (2013–2016)
 I'm an Animal (2012–2018)
 Painting Pictures (2004–2007)
 Quizzine (2015–2016)
 Small Potatoes (2011–2015)
 You Can Do It Too! (August 21, 2018 – September 1, 2022)
 Zoe and Charlie'' (1995–1996)

References

External links
 

 
TVOKids